CPR3 may refer to:

 Palmerston Airport (TC LID: CPR3)
 CPR3, a candidate phylum of bacteria